Miallo is a rural locality in the Shire of Douglas, Queensland, Australia.

Geography 
The crops grown are sugarcane and tropical fruit.

There is a cane tramway system through Miallo to deliver sugarcane to the sugar mill at Mossman.

Thooleer is a neighbourhood in the locality.

History 
The name Miallo is an Aboriginal word, meaning wild country.

Mialloa Provisional School opened on 2 October 1911. It became Miallo State School on 30 July 1923.

On Sunday 20 December, St Anthony's Catholic Church was officially opened and dedicated by Bishop Thomas Cahill. It was a reconstruction of a building bought from Lawrence Butler Rutherford. Prior to the construction of the church, Mass had been held in private homes.

Education 
Miallo State School is a government primary (Prep-6) school for boys and girls at Miallo Bamboo Creek Road. In 2017, the school had an enrolment of 179 students with 16 teachers (11 full-time equivalent) and 13 non-teaching staff (6 full-time equivalent). In 2018, the school had an enrolment of 190 students with 16 teachers (11 full-time equivalent) and 12 non-teaching staff (6 full-time equivalent).

There is no secondary school in Miallo. The nearest government secondary school is Mossman State High School in neighbouring Mossman to the south.

References

Further reading 

 

Shire of Douglas
Localities in Queensland